Columbus Senior High School (CHS) is a public secondary school in Columbus, Wisconsin. Part of the Columbus School District, the school had an enrollment of 381 in 2013.

In addition to traditional high school offerings, Columbus High School students also have the opportunity to choose from electives in the areas of technology education, agri-science, business education, world languages and the arts, plus a host of co-curricular offerings.

History
Columbus Senior High School was established in 1875 at what is now the current Columbus Middle School at 200 West School Street. In 1958, the school district expanded and built what is now the current high school at 1164 Farnham Street.

Extracurricular activities

Clubs 
FBLA-PBL
FFA
 Marching band
 Concert band
 Jazz band
 Dance team
 Academic bowl
 Gay-Straight Alliance
 Art club
 Choir
 Forensics
 French and Spanish club
 Math club
 National Honor Society
 Student council
 Yearbook
 A/V club

Sports
The athletic program at the Columbus High School is very popular with the community. CHS sports are regulated by the WIAA, where CHS is a member of the Capitol North Conference Division 2.
Baseball
Boys' basketball
Boys' cross country
Boys' track
Football
Girls' basketball
Girls' cross country
Girls' tennis
Girls' track
Golf
Gymnastics
Soccer
Softball
Volleyball
Wrestling

State champions 
Softball - Class B - 1984
Football - Division 4 - 1990
Football - Division 4 - 1996
Girls' basketball - Division 2 - 2002
Girls' basketball - Division 2 - 2003
Girls' track - Division 2 - 2004
Boys' soccer - Division 3 - 2008

References 

https://www.columbus.k12.wi.us/domain/11

Public high schools in Wisconsin
Educational institutions established in 1875
Schools in Columbia County, Wisconsin
Columbus, Wisconsin
1875 establishments in Wisconsin